The Victoria Schuck Award is an annual prize granted by the American Political Science Association to the author of the best book published in the previous year on the topic of women and politics. The award is named in honor of the political scientist Victoria Schuck. Although a number of area-specific sections of the American Political Science Association have dedicated book awards, the Schuck Award is one of only a few awards given directly by the Association rather than by a subsection of it.

History
The prize was established in 1986 by the American Political Science Association's Executive Director Thomas E. Mann, its President Aaron Wildavsky, and its Executive Council, at the urging of Victoria Schuck. It was originally endowed by Schuck at a value of $500 per award, out of a fund that she donated totaling $3000. By 2020 the award carried a prize of $750.

The committee that awards the prize consists of political scientists who are members of the American Political Science Association; the first prize was awarded by Susan J. Carroll, Jean Bethke Elshtain, and Norma Noonan.

Past winners
The past recipients of the prize in each year are as follows:
 1988 Rebecca E. Klatch, Women of the new right
 1988 Jane Mansbridge, Why we lost the ERA
 1989 Zillah R. Eisenstein, The female body and the law
 1989 Carole Pateman, The sexual contract
 1990 Susan Moller Okin, Justice, gender and the family
 1990 Judith Stiehm, Arms and the enlisted woman
 1991 Jane Sherron De Hart and Donald G. Mathews, Sex, gender, and the politics of ERA : a state and the nation
 1991 Iris M. Young, Sex, Gender, and the Politics of Sex: A State and a Nation
 1992 Nancie Caraway, Segregated sisterhood: racism and the politics of American feminism
 1992 Anne Phillips, Engendering democracy
 1993 Virginia Sapiro, A vindication of political virtue: the political theory of Mary Wollstonecraft
 1994 Cynthia R. Daniels, At women's expense: state power and the politics of fetal rights
 1995 Barbara J. Nelson and Najma Chowdhury, Women and politics worldwide
 1996 Gwendolyn Mink, The wages of motherhood: inequality in the welfare state, 1917-1942
 1997 Kristi Andersen, After suffrage: women in partisan and electoral politics before the New Deal
 1998 Uma Narayan, Dislocating cultures: identities, traditions, and Third-World feminism
 1999 Mary Fainsod Katzenstein, Faithful and fearless: moving feminist protest inside the church and military
 2000 Judith A. Baer, Our lives before the law: constructing a feminist jurisprudence
 2001 Jean Reith Schroedel, Is the fetus a person? A comparison of policies across the fifty states
 2001 Aili Mari Tripp, Women & politics in Uganda
 2002 Sidney Verba, Kay Lehman Schlozman, and Nancy Burns, The private roots of public action: gender, equality, and political participation
 2002 Joshua S. Goldstein, War and gender: how gender shapes the war system and vice versa
 2003 Louise Chappell, Gendering Government: Feminist Engagement with the State in Australia and Canada
 2004 Nancy J. Hirschmann, Subject of Liberty: Toward a Feminist Theory of Freedom
 2005 Saba Mahmood, Politics of Piety: The Islamic Revival and the Feminist Subject
 2006 Valentine M. Moghadam, Globalizing Women: Transnational Feminist Networks
 2007 Shireen Hassim, Women's Organizations and Democracy in South Africa: Contesting Authority
 2007 Kathrin S. Zippel, The Politics of Sexual Harassment: A Comparative Study of the United States, the European Union, and Germany
 2008 Georgina Waylen, Engendering Transitions: Women’s Mobilization, Institutions, and Gender Outcomes
 2008 Anna Marie Smith, Welfare Reform and Sexual Regulation
 2009 Kristin Bumiller, In an Abusive State: How Neoliberalism Appropriated the Feminist Movement Against Sexual Violence
 2010 Mona Lena Krook, Quotas for Women in Politics: Gender and Candidate Selection Reform Worldwide
 2011 Torben Iversen and Frances Rosenbluth, Women, Work & Politics: The Political Economy of Gender Inequality
 2012 S. Laurel Weldon, When Protest Makes Policy: How Social Movements Represent Disadvantages Groups
 2013 Myra Marx Ferree, Varieties of Feminism: German Gender Politics in Global Perspective
 2014 Deborah Jordan Brooks, He Runs, She Runs: Why Gender Stereotypes Do Not Harm Women Candidates
 2015 Lisa Baldez, Defying Convention: U.S. Resistance to the U.N. Treaty on Women's Rights
 2016 Sarah Deer, The Beginning and End of Rape: Confronting Sexual Violence in Native America
 2017 J. Kevin Corder and Christina Wolbrecht, Counting Women's Ballots: Female voters from Suffrage to through the New Deal
 2018 Kara Ellerby, No Shortcut to Change: An Unlikely Path to a More Gender Equitable World
 2019 Brooke Ackerly, Just Responsibility: A Human Rights Theory of Global Justice
 2020 Melody Ellis Valdini , The Inclusion Calculation: Why Men Appropriate Women’s Representation

References

Academic awards
Awards established in 1986
Political book awards